Kilmarnock was a county constituency of the House of Commons of the Parliament of the United Kingdom from 1918 to 1983. It elected one Member of Parliament (MP) by the first past the post system of election.

The constituency included the area of the former parliamentary burgh of Kilmarnock. The parliamentary burgh had been, previously, a component of the Kilmarnock Burghs constituency.

Prominent Members for this seat included long-serving Scottish Secretary Willie Ross, and senior judge Craigie Mason Aitchison.

Boundaries

1918 to 1950 

The constituency was created by the Representation of the People Act 1918 as one of four constituencies covering the county of Ayr and the county of Bute. Of the other three constituencies, two were county constituencies: Bute and Northern Ayrshire and South Ayrshire. The third, Ayr Burghs, was a district of burghs constituency. All four constituencies were entirely within the boundaries of the two counties.

The Kilmarnock constituency consisted of "The county district of Kilmarnock, inclusive of all burghs situated therein except insofar as included in the Ayr District of Burghs."

The counties of Ayr and Bute had been covered, previously, by the five constituencies of Ayr Burghs, Buteshire, Kilmarnock Burghs, North Ayrshire and South Ayrshire. Two of these, Ayr Burghs and Kilmarnock Burghs, had included areas (parliamentary burghs) outside the two counties.

1950 to 1974 

Constituency boundaries were redrawn in 1950, creating five constituencies to cover the counties of Ayr and Bute. Ayr Burghs was abolished and two new county constituencies, Ayr and Central Ayrshire, were created. Part of the Kilmarnock constituency was transferred to the new Central Ayrshire constituency.

1974 to 1975 

In 1974, the boundary between the Kilmarnock and Ayrshire Central constituencies was redrawn to enlarge Kilmarnock.

1975 to 1983 

In 1975, under the Local Government (Scotland) Act 1973, local government counties were abolished and replaced by a system of regions and districts. The areas of the counties of Ayr and Bute were merged into the Strathclyde region and, thus, the Kilmarnock constituency became one of a number covering the region. Eight years were to elapse before new constituency boundaries took account of new local government boundaries.

In 1983 the Kilmarnock constituency was merged into the Kilmarnock and Loudoun constituency.

Members of Parliament

Election results

Elections in the 1910s

Elections in the 1920s

Elections in the 1930s

Elections in the 1940s

Elections in the 1950s

Elections in the 1960s

Elections in the 1970s

See also 
 Kilmarnock
 1929 Kilmarnock by-election
 1933 Kilmarnock by-election
 1946 Kilmarnock by-election
 Former United Kingdom Parliament constituencies

References 

Historic parliamentary constituencies in Scotland (Westminster)
Constituencies of the Parliament of the United Kingdom established in 1918
Constituencies of the Parliament of the United Kingdom disestablished in 1983
Politics of Kilmarnock